Crescent is an unincorporated community in Klamath County, Oregon, United States. Crescent has a post office with ZIP code 97733.

Demographics

Climate
This region experiences warm (but not hot) and dry summers, with no average monthly temperatures above .  According to the Köppen Climate Classification system, Crescent has a warm-summer Mediterranean climate, abbreviated "Csb" on climate maps.

References

Unincorporated communities in Klamath County, Oregon
Unincorporated communities in Oregon